Tropidurus oreadicus is a species of lizard of the Tropiduridae family. It is endemic to Brazil and widely distributed in the Cerrado.

The tail is 1.2–1.8 times SVL. It is oviparous.

References

Tropidurus
Reptiles of Brazil
Lizards of South America
Endemic fauna of Brazil
Taxa named by Miguel Trefaut Rodrigues
Reptiles described in 1987